Physolaesthus is a genus of beetles in the family Carabidae, containing the following species:

 Physolaesthus australis Chaudoir, 1850 
 Physolaesthus caviceps (Andrewes, 1936) 
 Physolaesthus grandipalpis W.J. Macleay, 1871 
 Physolaesthus insularis Bates, 1878 
 Physolaesthus limbatus (Broun, 1880)  [possible synonym of P. insularis]
 Physolaesthus minor (Louwerens, 1956) 
 Physolaesthus pallidus Blackburn, 1890 
 Physolaesthus ruficollis Sloane, 1900 
 Physolaesthus suturalis Castelnau, 1867

References

Licininae